Gnorismoneura zetessima is a moth of the family Tortricidae. It is found in China.

The wingspan is 18.5–21 mm for females.

References

Moths described in 1977
Archipini
Moths of Asia
Taxa named by Józef Razowski